David Stewart Cross (4 April 19286 April 1989) was the second Bishop of Doncaster who was later translated to Blackburn.

Educated at Trinity College, Dublin, he was made deacon on Trinity Sunday 1954 (13 June) and ordained priest the following Trinity Sunday (5 June 1955) — both times by Noel Hudson, Bishop of Newcastle, at Newcastle Cathedral. His first post was as a curate at Hexham.  From 1960 to 1963 he was Precentor of St Albans Cathedral then moved to Manchester to serve St Ambrose Church in Chorlton-on-Medlock.

From 1968 to 1976 he was a producer and broadcaster for BBC religious broadcasting at Manchester, which included a TV Songs of Praise from Blackburn Cathedral, whose diocese he would later serve as bishop.

In 1976 he was ordained to the episcopate, first serving as suffragan Bishop of Doncaster. His consecration was on 2 July 1976 at York Minster, by Stuart Blanch, Archbishop of York. Then in 1982 he was appointed diocesan Bishop of Blackburn, serving until his premature death from cancer in 1989. He was survived by his wife, Mary, a son and two daughters.

He is today perhaps best known for his hymn "Father, Lord of all creation", published in several English-language hymnbooks.

See also

References

1928 births
Alumni of Trinity College Dublin
Bishops of Doncaster
Bishops of Blackburn
1989 deaths
20th-century Church of England bishops